The Groupe Latécoère is an aircraft company based in Toulouse, France. Founded by the aeronautics pioneer Pierre-Georges Latécoère during 1917, the company became well known in its first few decades for its range of seaplanes, such as the six-engined Latécoère 631.

Presently, Groupe Latécoère operates as a major supplier of aerostructures, producing sections of fuselage and doors, having become the second-largest European supplier of onboard electrical wire harnesses and avionics bays through its Latelec subsidiary company. It is currently a member of the CAC Small and  participates in all segments of aeronautics: commercial airliners with Airbus and Boeing, regional aircraft with Embraer and Bombardier, business aircraft with Dassault Aviation, as well as military aircraft with Dassault and Airbus.

History
The company has its roots in the First World War; during September 1917, aeronautics pioneer Pierre-Georges Latécoère decided to invest in a series of factories in Toulouse. The business initially focused on the production of military material, such as shells and aircraft. It reportedly delivered roughly 800 aircraft to the French Army.

Following the end of the conflict, Latécoère engaged in the design and manufacture of numerous seaplanes. Perhaps the most significant of these was the six-engined Latécoère 631, a large passenger aircraft designed for transatlantic journeys. Billed as being The Ship of the Skies, the 631 performed its maiden flight during 1939; a total of 10 aircraft were completed. It was the largest production seaplane to ever be built, having a wingspan roughly one-third larger than the Short Sunderland, another contemporary large seaplane. The type was performing regular passenger services up until September 1955.

By the turn of the century, Groupe Latecoere was principally known for the manufacture of aircraft equipment and aerostructures production. In the equipment sector, it is a leading manufacturer of avionics bays, onboard electrical harnesses, and closed-circuit television (CCTV) systems. Aerostructure work includes the production of fuselage sections, including both passenger and cargo doors, as a subcontractor to multiple aircraft manufacturers, such as Airbus, Boeing, Dassault Aviation, Bombardier Aerospace and Embraer. Furthermore, Groupe Latecoere provides design and engineering services for select clients. In addition to the firm's primary base in France, it operates at locations throughout the world, including the Czech Republic, Romania, the United States, Spain, the United Kingdom, Tunisia, Mexico and Brazil. Latecoere SA operates through a number of subsidiary businesses, including Letov Kbely, Latecoere do Brasil, and LaTelec, among others.

During the early 2010s, there were rumours that the British industrial conglomerate GKN would potentially acquire Groupe Latécoère. In early 2015, as a consequence of the company's high debt ratio, the firm restructured its operations, resulting in a significant drop in debt levels via an equity exchange, opening itself up to greater foreign ownership in the process. By September 2017, the company's financial situation had improved to such an extent that it was reportedly once again looking to expand its aerospace portfolio via acquisitions. That same year, it also committed to the establishment of a new company headquarters.

In early April 2019, it was announced that private equity firm Searchlight Capital had agreed to purchase a 26 percent stake in Groupe Latécoère in exchange for $106.8 million. By December 2019, the buying of additional shares had given Searchlight a controlling stake in the firm; this generated some political controversy over the firm's now-foreign ownership.

Aircraft products 

 Latécoère 1
 Latécoère 2
 Latécoère 3 (1919) Two-seat, single-engine prototype transport and postal biplane.
 Latécoère 4 (1920) 15-passenger, three-engine prototype passenger biplane.
 Latécoère 5 (1924) Three-engine prototype bomber biplane developed from the Latécoère 4.
 Latécoère 6 (1924) Four-engine bomber biplane.
 Latécoère 7*
 Latécoère 8 (1922) Five-passenger, single-engine biplane airliner.
 Latécoère 9*
 Latécoère 10*
 Latécoère 11*
 Latécoère 12*
 Latécoère 13* (1922) Twin-engine airliner.
 Latécoère 14 (1923) Three-passenger, single-engine airliner.
 Latécoère 15 (1925) Six-passenger, twin-engine monoplane airliner.
 Latécoère 16 (1924) Four-passenger, single engine airliner developed from the Latécoère 14.
 Latécoère 17 (1924) Four-passenger, single engine monoplane airliner.
 Latécoère 18 
 Latécoère 19 (1925) Twin-engine prototype monoplane bomber developed from the Latécoère 15.
 Latécoère 20*
 Latécoère 21 (1926) Six-passenger, twin-engine monoplane flying boat airliner.
 Latécoère 22 (1927) Single-seat, single-engine mailplane.
 Latécoère 23 (1927) Eight-passenger, twin-engine monoplane flying boat transport developed from the Latécoère 21.
 Latécoère 24 (1927) Three-engine parasol-wing monoplane flying boat, intended as a transatlantic mailplane.
 Latécoère 25 (1926) Five-passenger, single-engine airliner.
 Latécoère 26 (1926) Single-engine mailplane.
 Latécoère 27* (1927) Unbuilt improved version of the Latécoère 24.
 Latécoère 28 (1927) Eight-passenger, single engine long-haul monoplane airliner and mailplane developed from the Latécoère 26.
 Latécoère 29 (gros)*
 Latécoère 30* 
 Latécoère 32 (1928) Four-passenger, twin-engine monoplane flying boat airliner and mailplane developed from the Latécoère 23.
 Latécoère 101*
 Latécoère 120*
 Latécoère 124*
 Latécoère 130*
 Latécoère 132*
 Latécoère 140*
 Latécoère 150*
 Latécoère 160*
 Latécoère 170*
 Latécoère 180*
 Latécoère 181*
 Latécoère 190*
 Latécoère 200*
 Latécoère 210*
 Latécoère 220*
 Latecoere 225 (1984) Single-seat microlight amphibian
 Latécoère 255*
 Latécoère 270*
 Latécoère 290 (1931) Single-engine floatplane torpedo bomber.
 Latécoère 291*
 Latécoère 292*
 Latécoère 292/2*
 Latécoère 293 Version of the Latécoère 290.
 Latécoère 294 Version of the Latécoère 290
 Latécoère 295*
 Latécoère 296 Version of the Latécoère 290
 Latécoère 297*
 Latécoère 298 (1936) Single-engine floatplane torpedo and dive bomber.
 Latécoère 299 (1939) Landplane reconnaissance-torpedo bomber version of the Latécoère 298.
 Latécoère 300 (1931) Four-engine flying boat mailplane.
 Latécoère 301 Version of the Latécoère 300
 Latécoère 302 Maritime reconnaissance version of the Latécoère 300
 Latécoère 310*
 Latécoère 330*
 Latécoère 340 (1930) Five-passenger, three-engine medium range flying boat airliner.
 Latécoère 350 (1931) Ten-passenger, three-engine airliner developed from the Latécoère 28.
 Latécoère 360*
 Latécoère 370*
 Latécoère 380 (1930) Twin-engine long-range flying boat mailplane.
 Latécoère 381 (1934) Maritime patrol version of the Latécoère 380.
 Latécoère 382*
 Latécoère 383*
 Latécoère 384*
 Latécoère 385*
 Latécoère 386*
 Latécoère 410*
 Latécoère 420*
 Latécoère 430*
 Latécoère 440 (1931) Single-engine floatplane coastal defence aircraft developed from the Latécoère 28.
 Latécoère 441*
 Latécoère 442*
 Latécoère 443*
 Latécoère 460*
 Latécoère 470*
 Latécoère 480*
 Latécoère 490 (1931) Single-engine, two-seat prototype reconnaissance monoplane.
 Latécoère 491 (1931) Second prototype of the Latécoère 490.
 Latécoère 492*
 Latécoère 493*
 Latécoère 500 (1932) Twin-engine long-range flying boat mailplane.
 Latécoère 501 (1932) Airliner version of the Latécoère 500.
 Latécoère 502*
 Latécoère 503*
 Latécoère 510*
 Latécoère 520*
 Latécoère 521 (1935) 30 to 72-passenger, six-engine large long-range flying boat airliner, militarized during WW2.
 Latécoère 522 Version of the Latécoère 521.
 Latécoère 523 Maritime patrol version of the Latécoère 521.
 Latécoère 524*
 Latécoère 525*
 Latécoère 530*
 Latécoère 531*
 Latécoère 550 Four-engine floatplane torpedo bomber.
 Latécoère 560*
 Latécoère 570 (1939) Twin-engine prototype medium bomber.
 Latécoère 580*
 Latécoère 581*
 Latécoère 582 (1935) Three-engine long-range flying boat patrol aircraft.
 Latécoère 590*
 Latécoère 600*
 Latécoère 601*
 Latécoère 602*
 Latécoère 610*
 Latécoère 611 (1940) Four-engine prototype flying boat maritime reconnaissance aircraft.
 Latécoère 612*
 Latécoère 613*
 Latécoère 614*
 Latécoère 615*
 Latécoère 616*
 Latécoère 617*
 Latécoère 620*
 Latécoère 630*
 Latécoère 631 (1942) 46-passenger, six-engine large long-range flying boat airliner
 Latécoère 632*
 Latécoère 633*
 Latécoère 634*
 Latécoère 635*
 Latécoère 636*
 Latécoère 637*
 Latécoère 638*
 Latécoère 639*
 Latécoère 640*
 Latécoère 670*
 Latécoère 671*
 Latécoère 672*
 Latécoère 673*
 Latécoère 675*
 Latécoère 703*
 Latécoère 710
 Latécoère 730*
 Latécoère 740*
 Latécoère 780*
 Latécoère 790*
 Latécoère 800*
 Latécoère 810*
 Latécoère 820*
 Latécoère 830*
 Latécoère 850*
 Latécoère 860*
 Latécoère 870*
 Latécoère 880*
 Latécoère 900*

aircraft marked * were projects only

Missile products for the French Navy 
 Malaface
 Malafon

Current products
 Airbus A330 A340 (mid-fuselage upper shell)
 Airbus A340/500-600 (mid-fuselage upper shell and lower nose section)
 Airbus A380 (passenger doors, bulk cargo doors and lower nose section)
 Airbus A320 (passenger doors)
 Boeing 787 (passenger doors)
 Bombardier CRJ 700/900 (bulk cargo door)
 Embraer ERJ 170/175/190/195 (passenger doors, emergency exit door and forward and aft fuselage barrel section)
 Dassault Falcon 50 EX (Rear fuselage section)
 Dassault Falcon 7X (baggage door and rear fuselage section)
 Dassault Falcon 900 B/EX (Rear fuselage section)

Source

Current leadership
 Chairman of the Board: Pierre Gadonneix
 CEO: Thierry Mootz

In popular culture
The name Latécoère is part of a "mystique" in France around the beginning of aviation and adventurers. It is part of a famous song by Henri Salvador, "Jardin d'Hiver", in its 3rd verse :

"Je voudrais du Fred Astaire
Revoir un Latécoère
Je voudrais toujours te plaire
Dans mon jardin d'hiver"

A possibly even more popular (and arguably very gross) reference is found in Lola Rastaquouère, a song by Serge Gainsbourg, a famous and controversial French artist:

"Comment oses-tu me parler d'amour toi, hein
Toi qui n'as pas connu Lola Rastaquouère
Je lui faisais le plein comme au Latécoère
Qui décolle en vibrant vers les cieux africains"

Latécoère is mentioned by name in the first sentence of Antoine de Saint Exupéry's famous autobiographical work, Wind, Sand, and Stars, (1936) - from the English translation:

"In 1926 I was enrolled as student airline pilot by the Latécoère Company, the predecessors of Aéropostale (now Air France) in the operation of the line between Toulouse, in southwestern France, and Dakar, in French West Africa."

References

External links

 Company official website
 Company official site 
 Profile on Google Finance.

Aerospace companies of France
Aircraft manufacturers of France
Manufacturing companies based in Toulouse
French brands
Vehicle manufacturing companies established in 1917
French companies established in 1917
Companies listed on Euronext Paris